Jonathan Francis Bennett (born 17 February 1930) is a philosopher of language and metaphysics, specialist of Kant's philosophy and a historian of early modern philosophy. He has New Zealand citizenship by birth and has since acquired UK and Canadian citizenship.

Life and education
Jonathan Bennett was born in Greymouth, New Zealand to Francis Oswald Bennett and Pearl Allan Brash Bennett. His father was a doctor and his mother a homemaker. He read philosophy at the University of Canterbury (formerly Canterbury University College) and was awarded his MA there in 1953. He then went to the University of Oxford where he was a member of Magdalen College, Oxford. He obtained his BPhil in 1955.

Career
Bennett's first academic post was as a junior lecturer at the University of Auckland, New Zealand (then Auckland University College) (1952). He was an instructor in philosophy at Haverford College (Pennsylvania) (1955-56), then a lecturer in moral science (philosophy) at the University of Cambridge (1956–68), then at Simon Fraser University (1968–70), the University of British Columbia (1970–79), and in 1979 he went to Syracuse University as professor of philosophy. He remained in this position until his retirement in 1997.

In 1980, he was the Tanner Lecturer at Brasenose College of Oxford University. His lectures were refined and published in his 1995 book The Act Itself. In this work he argues that letting someone die is as immoral as killing someone. This also applies to other harms that one commits or fails to prevent. This view has been widely discussed for example by Judith Jarvis Thomson

In 1992, he was the John Locke Lecturer at the University of Oxford giving lectures on 'Judging Behaviour: Analysis in Moral Theory'. 

In 1985, he was elected a Fellow of the American Academy of Arts and Sciences. The British Academy extended him the same honour in 1991. In the same year he was awarded a LittD from the University of Cambridge.
Bennett has written extensively on philosophy of mind, philosophy of language, events, conditionals, and consequentialist ethics. He is particularly renowned for his interpretations of major early modern philosophers and he has written five books in this area. A Festschrift to commemorate his 60th birthday was published in 1990.

Bennett's website is devoted to making the texts of early modern philosophers more accessible to today's students.

Bibliography
Books
 1989 (1964). Rationality. Hackett.
 1966. Kant's Analytic. Cambridge University Press.
 1971. Locke, Berkeley, Hume: Central Themes. Oxford University Press.
 1974. Kant’s Dialectic. Cambridge University Press.
 1990 (1976). Linguistic Behaviour. Hackett.
 1984. A Study of Spinoza’s Ethics. Hackett.
 1988. Events and their Names. Hackett.
 1995. The Act Itself. Oxford University Press.
 2001. Learning from Six Philosophers. Oxford University Press.
 2003. A Philosophical Guide to Conditionals. Oxford University Press.

Selected journal articles

 1954. 'Meaning and Implication', Mind, 63, pp. 451–63.
 1965. 'Substance, Reality and Primary Qualities', American Philosophical Quarterly, 2, pp. 1–17.
 1988. 'Thoughtful Brutes', Proceedings of the American Philosophical Association, 62 pp. 197–210.
 1993. 'Negation and Abstention: Two theories of Allowing', Ethics, 104, pp. 75–96.

References

External links
earlymoderntexts.com – Translations by Bennett of philosophical classics of the English language into contemporary English. Also works in Latin, French and German.

1930 births
20th-century British philosophers
Philosophy academics at the University of Cambridge
Alumni of Magdalen College, Oxford
British historians of philosophy
Fellows of the American Academy of Arts and Sciences
Living people
People from Greymouth
Philosophers of language
Academic staff of Simon Fraser University
Syracuse University faculty
Academic staff of the University of British Columbia
Spinoza scholars